Making Sense of Marx is a 1985 book about Karl Marx by the social and political theorist Jon Elster, in which the author reevaluates Marx's ideas. The book has received a mixture of praise and criticism from commentators.

Reception
Making Sense of Marx was praised as "sharp" and "hard-headed" by the political scientist David McLellan. The political philosopher Richard W. Miller called Elster's work "erudite".

Conversely, the Marxist economist Ernest Mandel gave the work a negative review, while the philosopher Jan Narveson wrote that the work was, "greeted with highly mixed feelings by those who had hoped the title meant that there was sense to be made" of Marx.

Bibliography
Books

References

1985 non-fiction books
Books about Karl Marx
Books by Jon Elster
Cambridge University Press books
English-language books
Rational choice theory